Giovanni Battista Borea d'Olmo was born in Genoa, Kingdom of Sardinia on 11 October 1831 and died in Sanremo the 19 October 1936 at 105 years
He was a member of Italian Senate from 18 November 1922 to his death.

References

Italian centenarians
Men centenarians
Nobility from Genoa
1831 births
1936 deaths
Politicians from Genoa
Members of the Senate of the Kingdom of Italy